Ina is a rural locality (a settlement) in Barguzinsky District, Republic of Buryatia, Russia. The population was 282 as of 2010. There are 6 streets.

Geography 
Ina is located 61 km northeast of Barguzin (the district's administrative centre) by road. Yubileyny is the nearest rural locality.

References 

Rural localities in Barguzinsky District